The Engine House No. 13 in Tacoma, Washington, at 3825 N. Twenty-fifth St., is a fire station, which was built in 1911.  It was listed on the National Register of Historic Places in 1986.

It has red brick walls, with brick laid in stretcher bond.  The second floor exterior was stuccoed.

In 1985, this was still an active fire station.

References

Fire stations on the National Register of Historic Places in Washington (state)
National Register of Historic Places in Tacoma, Washington
Fire stations completed in 1911